In ogni senso (In Every Sense) is the fifth album by Italian pop/rock singer Eros Ramazzotti, produced by Piero Cassano and released on April 10, 1990, on the BMG label.  In ogni senso topped the Italian Albums chart and was Ramazzotti's most successful album internationally to that point, also reaching #2 in Europe's second-largest music sales market, Germany. 
Backing vocals on several tracks were recorded in London with renowned English-based session singers including Jimmy Helms, Katie Kissoon, Carol Kenyon and Tessa Niles.

Track listing 
(All tracks written by Pierangelo Cassano, Adelio Cogliati, Eros Ramazzotti, and English translations are listed, where possible.)
 "Se bastasse una canzone" - 5:06 (If a Song's Enough) 
 "C'è una strada in cielo" - 4:21 ("There's a Road in the Sky")
 "Amore contro" - 4:24 ("Love Against")
 "Dammi la luna" - 3:49 ("Give me the Moon")
 "Taxi Story" - 3:59
 "Dolce Barbara" - 4:05 ("Sweet Barbara")
 "Amarti è l'immenso per me" - 4:22 (duet with Antonella Bucci) ("Loving You is the Best Thing for Me")
 "Canzoni lontane" - 4:59 ("Distant Song")
 "Cara prof" - 3:58 ("Dear Professor")
 "Cantico" - 5:44 ("Canticle")
 "Oggi che giorno è" - 4:33 ("Today is that day"; literally, "Today, that day is.")
 "Andare...in ogni senso" - 2:20 (duet with Piero Cassano) ("Go...in every sense")

Chart performance

Weekly charts

Year-end charts

Certifications and sales

See also
List of best-selling albums in Italy

References

Eros Ramazzotti albums
1990 albums
Sony Music Italy albums
Italian-language albums